This is a list of the first minority male lawyer(s) and judge(s) in South Dakota. It includes the year in which the men were admitted to practice law (in parentheses). Also included are those who achieved other distinctions, such becoming the first in their state to graduate from law school or become a political figure.

Firsts in South Dakota's history

Lawyers 

First African American male: Will F. Reden (1908) 
First African American male (admitted to State Bar of South Dakota): Madison Jackson 
First American Indian (Rosebud Sioux Tribe) male: Ramon Roubideaux (1950)  
A Sioux Indian male lawyer who is among the "First Thirteen" Native American lawyers to have argued federal Indian law cases before the U.S. Supreme Court: Terry L. Pechota (1972)

United States Attorney 

 First Native American males:Terry L. Pechota (1972) and Philip N. Hogen from 1979-1981 and 1981-1991 respectively

Political Office 

First Lebanese American and Arab American male (senator): James Abourezk (c. 1966) in 1973

See also 
 List of first minority male lawyers and judges in the United States

Other topics of interest 

 List of first women lawyers and judges in the United States
 List of first women lawyers and judges in South Dakota

References 

 
Minority, South Dakota, first
Minority, South Dakota, first
Legal history of South Dakota
South Dakota lawyers
Lists of people from South Dakota